Bjørn Guldvog (born 16 June 1958) is a Norwegian physician and civil servant.

He took the cand.med. and later the dr.med. degree, and was a researcher at the Norwegian Institute of Public Health from 1989 to 1992. The directorate changed its name to the Norwegian Directorate for Health in 2008.

Bjørn Guldvog leads The Norwegian Directorate of Health’s work against the covid-19 pandemic in Norway.

References

1958 births
Living people
Norwegian public health doctors
Directors of government agencies of Norway